William Edward Baekey (November 13, 1925 – May 4, 1988) was an American film and television actor.

Life and career 
Bakey was born in Havre de Grace, Maryland, and moved to Baltimore at an early age. He attended Baltimore City College, graduating in 1943, and began his acting career in 1945 at the Hilltop Theatre. He later moved to New York to perform at the Provincetown Playhouse. He then worked as an announcer for the television station WBAL-TV and as a director for a radio station. In 1957 he appeared on the CBS television station WJZ-TV as the clown "Pop-Pop" in The Jack Wells Show. He also played the folk singer Eddie Greensleeve in Mike Wallace's program. 
 
In 1966, he played George Beenstock in the Broadway play Walking Happy. Bakey returned to television work in 1967, appearing in the western television series Death Valley Days. He guest-starred in television programs including Gunsmoke, Mission: Impossible, The F.B.I., The Big Valley, Bonanza, The Streets of San Francisco, Cannon, Cimarron Strip, Dundee and the Culhane, The Guns of Will Sonnett, Night Gallery, Police Woman, One Day at a Time, Hill Street Blues and Star Trek.

Bakey’s film credits include The White Buffalo, Zapped!, Darktown Strutters, The Evil, Heaven with a Gun, For Pete's Sake, The Baltimore Bullet and Telefon. In 1973, he appeared in the film The Sting. His final film credit was for the 1984 film The Philadelphia Experiment.

Death 
Bakey died in May 1988 in Los Angeles, California, at the age of 62.

Filmography

References

External links 

Rotten Tomatoes profile

1925 births
1988 deaths
Havre de Grace, Maryland
Male actors from Maryland
American male film actors
American male television actors
American radio directors
20th-century American male actors
Baltimore City College alumni
American impressionists (entertainers)